Maalaala Mo Kaya (abbreviated MMK), also known as Memories in English, is a Filipino television series, which was first aired on May 15, 1991. MMK is the longest-running drama anthology on Philippine television.

Episodes

References

2010 Philippine television seasons
2011 Philippine television seasons
Maalaala Mo Kaya